The 53rd Cannes Film Festival started on 14 May and ran until 25 May 2000. French film director, screenwriter, and producer Luc Besson was the Jury President. The Palme d'Or went to the Danish film Dancer in the Dark by Lars von Trier.

The festival opened with Vatel, directed by Roland Joffé and closed with Stardom, directed by Denys Arcand. Virginie Ledoyen was the mistress of ceremonies.

Juries

Main competition
The following people were appointed as the Jury for the feature films of the 2000 Official Selection:
 Luc Besson (France) Jury President
 Jonathan Demme (United States)
 Nicole Garcia (France)
 Jeremy Irons (United Kingdom)
 Mario Martone (Italy)
 Patrick Modiano (France)
 Arundhati Roy (India)
 Aitana Sánchez-Gijón (Spain)
 Kristin Scott Thomas (United Kingdom)
 Barbara Sukowa (Germany)

Un Certain Regard
The following people were appointed as the Jury of the 2000 Un Certain Regard:
Jane Birkin (actress)
 Jan Schulz-Ojala
 José Maria Prado (Director of the Filmoteca Española)
 Marc Voinchet (critic)
 Marie-Noëlle Tranchant (critic)
 Noël Tinazzi (critic)

Cinéfondation and short films
The following people were appointed as the Jury of the Cinéfondation and short films competition:
 Jean-Pierre Dardenne & Luc Dardenne (directors) (Belgium) President
 Abderrahmane Sissako (director) (Mauritania)
 Claire Denis (director) (France)
 Francesca Comencini (director) (Italy)
 Mira Sorvino (actress) (United States)

Camera d'Or
The following people were appointed as the Jury of the 2000 Camera d'Or:
Otar Iosseliani (director) (Georgia) President
 Caroline VIe-Toussaint (journalist) (France)
 Céline Panzolini (cinephile) (France)
 Eric Moulin (representative of the technical industries) (France)
 Fabienne Bradfer (critic) (France)
 Martial Knaebel (critic) (Germany)
Solveig Anspach (director) (France)
Yorgos Arvanitis (cinematographer) (Greece)

Official selection

In competition - Feature film
The following feature films competed for the Palme d'Or:

 Bread and Roses by Ken Loach
 Chunhyangdyun by Kwon-taek Im
 Code inconnu: Récit incomplet de divers voyages by Michael Haneke
 Dancer in the Dark by Lars von Trier
 Esther Kahn by Arnaud Desplechin
 Estorvo by Ruy Guerra
 Fast Food Fast Women by Amos Kollek
 Gohatto by Nagisa Oshima
 Guizi lai le by Jiang Wen
 Harry, un ami qui vous veut du bien by Dominik Moll
 In the Mood for Love by Wong Kar-wai
 Kippur by Amos Gitai
 Les destinées sentimentales by Olivier Assayas
 Nurse Betty by Neil LaBute
 O Brother, Where Art Thou? by Joel Coen
 Svadba by Pavel Lungin
 Sånger från andra våningen by Roy Andersson
 Takhté siah by Samira Makhmalbaf
 The Golden Bowl by James Ivory
 The Yards by James Gray
 Trolösa by Liv Ullmann
 Yi Yi by Edward Yang
 Yurîka by Shinji Aoyama

Un Certain Regard
The following films were selected for the competition of Un Certain Regard:

 Mùa hè chiều thẳng đứng by Tran Anh Hung
 Abschied - Brechts letzter Sommer by Jan Schütte
 Así es la vida by Arturo Ripstein
 Capitães de Abril by Maria de Medeiros
 Djomeh by Hassan Yektapanah
 Eu tu eles by Andrucha Waddington
 Famous by Griffin Dunne
 I Dreamed of Africa by Hugh Hudson
 Jacky by Brat Ljatifi, Fow Pyng Hu
 La saison des hommes by Moufida Tlatli
 Le premier du nom by Sabine Franel
 Lista de Espera by Juan Carlos Tabío
 Lost Killers by Dito Tsintsadze
 Nichiyobi wa Owaranai by Yōichirō Takahashi
 Virgin Stripped Bare by Her Bachelors by Hong Sang-soo
 Preferisco il rumore del mare by Mimmo Calopresti
 Saint-Cyr by Patricia Mazuy
 The King Is Alive by Kristian Levring
 Things You Can Tell Just by Looking at Her by Rodrigo García
 Tierra del fuego by Miguel Littín
 Wild Blue, notes à quelques voix by Thierry Knauff
 Woman on Top by Fina Torres

Films out of competition
The following films were selected to be screened out of competition:

 A Conversation With Gregory Peck by Barbara Kopple
 April by Otar Iosseliani
 Cecil B. Demented by John Waters
 Crouching Tiger, Hidden Dragon by Ang Lee
 Honest by David A. Stewart
 The Gleaners and I by Agnès Varda
 Mission to Mars by Brian De Palma
 Requiem for a Dream by Darren Aronofsky
 Stardom by Denys Arcand
 Under Suspicion by Stephen Hopkins
 Vatel by Roland Joffé

Cinéfondation
The following films were selected for the competition of Cinéfondation:

 Ascension by Malgoska Szumowska (Poland)
 Course de nuit by Chuyên Bui Thac (Vietnam)
 De janela pro cinema by Quia Rodrígues (Brazil)
 Dessert by (Kinu'ach) Amit Sakomski (Israel)
 Don't Miss the Killer by Anastas Haralampidis (Greece)
 Five Feet High and Rising by Peter Sollett (United States)
 Indien by Pernille Fischer Christensen (Denmark)
 Kiss It Up to God by Caran Hartsfield (United States)
 Le vent souffle où il veut by Claire Doyon (France)
 Leben 1, 2, 3 by Michael Schorr (Germany)
 Nocturnal by Anna Viduleja (Latvia)
 Breathing Under Water (Respirar (Debaixo d'água)) by António Ferreira (Portugal)
 Shoot the Dog by Ariko Kimura (Japan)

Short film competition
The following short films competed for the Short Film Palme d'Or:

3 Minutes by Ana Luiza Azevedo
 Shadows (Anino) by Raymond Red- Short Film Palme d'Or winner
Des morceaux de ma femme by Frédéric Pelle
Shut the Door by Jens Lien
Mieux ou moins bien ? by Jocelyn Cammack
S'Arretent by Anthony Mullins

Parallel sections

International Critics' Week
The following films were screened for the 39th International Critics' Week (39e Semaine de la Critique):

Feature film competition

 Amores perros by Alejandro González Iñárritu (Mexico)
 Hidden Whisper by Vivian Chang (Taiwan)
 Krampack by Cesc Gay (Spain)
 De l'histoire ancienne by Orso Miret (France)
 Good Housekeeping by Frank Novak (United States)
 Happy End by Jung Ji-woo (South Korea)
 Les Autres filles by Caroline Vignal (France)

Short film competition

 Faux contact by Eric Jameux (France)
 To Be Continued... by Linus Tunström (Sweden)
 The Hat (Le Chapeau) by Michèle Cournoyer (Canada)
 Les méduses by Delphine Gleize (France)
 The Artist's Circle by Bruce Marchfelder (Canada)
 Not I by Neil Jordan (Ireland, United Kingdom)
 Le Dernier rêve by Emmanuel Jespers (Belgium)

Directors' Fortnight
The following films were screened for the 2000 Directors' Fortnight (Quinzaine des Réalizateurs): 

 27 Missing Kisses by Nana Djordjadze
 L’Affaire Marcorelle by Serge Le Péron
 La Captive by Chantal Akerman
 Cuba Feliz by Karim Dridi
 Billy Elliot (Dancer) by Stephen Daldry
 Bread and Tulips (Pane e tulipani) by Silvio Soldini
 La Chambre obscure by Marie-Christine Questerbert
 Downtown 81 by Edo Bertoglio
 En avant ! (director not stated, 60 min.)
 Faites comme si je n’étais pas là by Olivier Jahan
 Film noir (Koroshi) by Masahiro Kobayashi
 Girlfight by Karyn Kusama
 Grüezi wohl Frau Stirnimaa by Sonja Wyss
 Jocelyne by Valérie Mréjen
 Le Secret by Virginie Wagon
 Lumumba by Raoul Peck
 Mallboy by Vincent Giarrusso
 No Place to Go (Die Unberührbare) by Oskar Roehler
 Peppermint Candy by Lee Chang-dong
 Petite Chérie by Anne Villacèque
 Purely Belter by Mark Herman
 Shadow of the Vampire by E. Elias Merhige
 Some Voices by Simon Cellan Jones
 The Three Madeleines (Les fantômes des Trois Madeleine) by Guylaine Dionne
 A Time for Drunken Horses (Zamani barayé masti asbha) by Bahman Ghobadi
 Tout va bien, on s’en va by Claude Mouriéras
 Werckmeister Harmoniak by Béla Tarr

Short films

 A corps perdu by Isabelle Broué (France)
 C’est bien la société by Valérie Pavia (France)
 C'est pas si compliqué by Xavier De Choudens (France)
 Derailed - extract from Phœnix Tape by Christoph Girardet, Matthias Müller (Germany)
 Des larmes de sang by Valérie Mréjen (France)
 Elisabeth by Valérie Mréjen (France)
 Ferment by Tim Macmillan (Great Britain)
 Flying Boys by Didier Seynave (Belgium)
 Furniture Poetry (and Other Rhymes for the Camera) by Paul Bush (Great Britain)
 Ghost by Steve Hawley (Great Britain)
 Grüezi Wohl Fraü Stirnimaa… or Malou möter Ingmar Bergman och Erland Josephson by Sonja Wyss (Switzerland - Netherlands)
 Head Stand by Lisa Robinson (United States)
 In Absentia by The Brothers Quay (Great Britain)
 Jocelyne by Valérie Mréjen (France)
 La Brèche de Roland by Arnaud & Jean-Marie Larrieu
 La Poire by Valérie Mréjen (France)
 La Pomme, la Figue et l’Amande by Joël Brisse
 La Vie heureuse by Valérie Pavia (France)
 Le mur by Faouzi Bensaïdi (France)
 Les Oiseaux en cage ne peuvent pas voler by Luis Briceño (France)
 Look at Me by Peter Stel (Netherlands)
 Love is All by Oliver Harrison (Great Britain)
 L'Epouvantail or Pugalo by Alexander Kott (Russia)
 Collision Course by Roberval Duarte (Brazil)
 Rue Francis by François Vogel (France)
 Salam by Souad El-Bouhati (France)
 Still Life by Pekka Sassi (Finland)
 The Morphology of Desire by Robert Arnold (United States)

Awards

Official awards
The following films and people received the 2000 Official selection awards:

In Competition
Palme d'Or: Dancer in the Dark by Lars von Trier
Grand Prix: Devils on the Doorstep (Guizi lai le) by Jiang Wen
Best Director: Edward Yang for Yi Yi
Best Screenplay: Nurse Betty by James Flamberg and John C. Richards
Best Actress: Björk for Dancer in the Dark
Best Actor: Tony Leung Chiu Wai for Fa yeung nin wa
Jury Prize: 
 Songs from the Second Floor (Sånger från andra våningen) by Roy Andersson
 Blackboards (Takhté siah) by Samira Makhmalbaf
Un Certain Regard
Un Certain Regard Award: Things You Can Tell Just by Looking at Her by Rodrigo Garcia
Un Certain Regard - Special Mention: Me You Them (Eu tu eles) by Andrucha Waddington
Cinéfondation
 First Prize: Five Feet High and Rising by Peter Sollett
 Second Prize: 
Dessert (Kinu'ach) by Amit Sakomski 
Kiss It Up to God by Caran Hartsfield
 Third Prize: 
Course de nuit by Chuyên Bui Thac 
Indien by Pernille Fischer Christensen
Golden Camera
Caméra d'Or: 
 Djomeh by Hassan Yektapanah
 A Time for Drunken Horses (Zamani barayé masti asbha) by Bahman Ghobadi
Short Films
Short Film Palme d'Or: Shadows (Anino) by Raymond Red

Independent awards
FIPRESCI Prizes
 Eureka (Yurîka) by Shinji Aoyama (In competition)
 A Time for Drunken Horses (Zamani barayé masti asbha) by Bahman Ghobadi (Directors' Fortnight)
Commission Supérieure Technique
 Technical Grand Prize: Christopher Doyle & Mark Lee Ping Bin  (cinematography), William Chang (editing) in In the Mood for Love
Ecumenical Jury
 Prize of the Ecumenical Jury: Eureka (Yurîka) by Shinji Aoyama
Award of the Youth
Foreign Film: Girlfight by Karyn Kusama
French Film: Saint-Cyr by Patricia Mazuy
Special Award: Krámpack by Cesc Gay
Awards in the frame of International Critics' Week
Canal+ Award: To Be Continued... by Linus Tunström
Young Critics Award - Best Short: Faux contact by Eric Jameux
Young Critics Award - Best Feature: Amores perros by Alejandro González Iñárritu
Awards in the frame of Directors' Fortnight
Kodak Short Film Award: Salam by Souad El-Bouhati
Kodak Short Film Award - Special Mention C'est pas si compliqué by Xavier De Choudens
Gras Savoye Award: Le mur by Faouzi Bensaïdi
Association Prix François Chalais
François Chalais Award: Kippur by Amos Gitai

References

Media
INA: Opening of the 2000 Festival (commentary in French)
INA: List of winners of the 2000 festival and interviews (commentary in French)

External links

2000 Cannes Film Festival (web.archive)
Official website Retrospective 2000 
Cannes Film Festival 2000 at Internet Movie Database

Cannes Film Festival
Cannes Film Festival
Cannes Film Festival
Cannes Film Festival
Cannes Film Festival
Cannes Film Festival